(The) Border Legion may refer to:

Border Legion (Shannara), the name of the army of Callahorn in the Shannara series of novels
The Border Legion, a 1916 novel by Zane Gray
The Border Legion (1918 film), an American silent Western film
The Border Legion (1924 film), a lost American silent Western film
The Border Legion (1930 film), an American pre-Code Western film
The Border Legion (1940 film), an American Western film